Archipelago International, formerly known as Aston International, is a full-service hotel management chain in Southeast Asia, and notably, the largest in Indonesia. Archipelago International entered the Southeast Asian market in 1997 and has an underlying portfolio consisting of more than 200 properties including hotels, condotels, resorts, serviced apartments and boutique villa resorts, of which more than 150 are operational (consisting of more than 20,000 rooms), and 100 more hotels are under development.

Properties of Hotels and Resorts

Saudi Arabia 
 ASTON INN Ajyad (Makkah)
 ASTON CITY Raddah Tower Jeddah
 ASTON CITY Al Salam (Madinah)
 Jabal Omar The Royal Alana (Makkah)
 Jabal Omar The Alana (Makkah)
 ASTON CITY Raddah Tower Jeddah

Cuba 
 GRAND ASTON Cayo Las Brujas Beach Resort & Spa 
 GRAND ASTON Varadero Beach Resort
 GRAND ASTON La Habana
 GRAND ASTON Cayo Paredón Beach Resort
 ASTON Panorama Hotel
 ASTON Costa Verde Beach Resort

Indonesia

Banten 
ASTON, ASTON Inn & ASTON City

 ASTON Anyer Beach Hotel 
 ASTON Cilegon Boutique Hotel

favehotel

 favehotel Bandara Tangerang (Tangerang)
 favehotel Hasyim Ashari Tangerang (Tangerang)

Jakarta
GRAND ASTON

 The Grove Suites by GRAND ASTON (South Jakarta)

ASTON, ASTON Inn & ASTON City

 ASTON Bellevue Radio Dalam (South Jakarta)
 ASTON Kartika Grogol Hotel & Conference Center (West Jakarta)
 ASTON Kemayoran City Hotel (Central Jakarta)
 ASTON Pluit Hotel & Residence (North Jakarta)
 ASTON Priority Simatupang & Conference Center (South Jakarta)

HARPER

 HARPER MT Haryono Cawang by ASTON (East Jakarta)

NEO+ & NEO

 Hotel NEO+ Kebayoran by ASTON (South Jakarta)
 Hotel NEO Mangga Dua Square by ASTON (North Jakarta)
 Hotel NEO Melawai by ASTON (North Jakarta)
 Hotel NEO Puri Indah by ASTON (West Jakarta)
 Hotel NEO Tendean Jakarta by ASTON (South Jakarta)

favehotel

 favehotel Gatot Subroto Jakarta (South Jakarta)
 favehotel Kelapa Gading Jakarta (North Jakarta)
 favehotel LTC Glodok Jakarta (West Jakarta)
 favehotel Melawai Jakarta (South Jakarta)
 favehotel PGC Cililitan Jakarta (East Jakarta)
 favehotel Pasar Baru Jakarta (Central Jakarta)
 favehotel Pluit Junction Jakarta (North Jakarta)
 favehotel Puri Indah Jakarta (West Jakarta)
 favehotel Tanah Abang Cideng (Central Jakarta)
 favehotel Zainul Arifin Jakarta (Central Jakarta)

West Java 
ASTON, ASTON Inn & ASTON City

 ASTON Bogor Hotel & Resort (Bogor)
 ASTON Cirebon Hotel & Convention Center (Cirebon)
 ASTON Imperial Bekasi Hotel & Conference Center (Bekasi)
 ASTON Pasteur Hotel (Bandung)
 ASTON Sentul Lake Resort & Conference Center (Bogor)
 ASTON Tropicana Hotel Bandung (Bandung)

The Alana

 The Alana Hotel & Conference Sentul City by ASTON (Bogor)

HARPER

 HARPER Cikarang by ASTON (Cikarang)
 HARPER Puncak by ASTON (Bogor) Opening Soon
 HARPER Purwakarta by ASTON (Purwakarta)

Quest

 Quest Cikarang by ASTON (Cikarang)

NEO+ & NEO

 Hotel NEO+ Green Savana Sentul City by ASTON (Bogor)
 Hotel NEO Cirebon by ASTON (Cirebon)
 Hotel NEO Dipatikur Bandung by ASTON (Bandung)

favehotel

 favehotel Braga Bandung (Bandung)
 favehotel Cimanuk Garut (Garut)
 favehotel Hypersquare Bandung (Bandung)
 favehotel Jababeka Cikarang (Bekasi)
 favehotel Karawang (Karawang)
 favehotel Margonda Depok (Depok)
 favehotel Padjajaran Bogor (Bogor)
 favehotel Premier Cihampelas (Bandung)
 favehotel Subang (Subang)
 favehotel Tasikmalaya (Tasikmalaya)

Central Java 
ASTON, ASTON Inn & ASTON City
 ASTON Imperium Purwokerto (Purwokerto)
 ASTON Inn Pandanaran (Semarang)
 ASTON Solo (Surakarta)
The Alana

 The Alana Hotel & Convention Center Solo by ASTON (Karanganyar)

Quest Hotel
 Quest Hotel Simpang Lima Semarang (Semarang)
NEO+ & NEO
 Hotel NEO Candi Simpang Lima (Semarang)
favehotel

 favehotel Diponegoro (Semarang)
 favehotel Manahan Solo (Surakarta)
 favehotel Solo Baru (Sukoharjo)
 favehotel Cilacap (Cilacap)
 favehotel Rembang (Rembang)

Yogyakarta 
GRAND ASTON

 GRAND ASTON Yogyakarta Hotel & Convention Center (Yogyakarta)

collection by ASTON

 Royal Malioboro by ASTON (Yogyakarta)

The Alana

 The Alana Yogyakarta Hotel & Convention Center by ASTON (Sleman)
 The Alana Malioboro Hotel & Conference Center by ASTON (Yogyakarta)

NEO+ & NEO

 Hotel NEO Malioboro Yogyakarta by ASTON (Yogyakarta)

HARPER

 HARPER Malioboro Yogyakarta by ASTON (Yogyakarta)

favehotel

 favehotel Kusumanegara Yogyakarta (Yogyakarta)
 favehotel Malioboro Yogyakarta (Yogyakarta)

East Java 
ASTON, ASTON Inn & ASTON City

 ASTON Banyuwangi Hotel & Conference Center (Banyuwangi)
 ASTON Bojonegoro City Hotel (Bojonegoro)
 ASTON Inn Gresik (Gresik)
 ASTON Inn Batu (Batu)
 ASTON Inn Jemursari (Surabaya) Opening SOON
 ASTON Jember Hotel & Conference Center (Jember)
 ASTON Madiun Hotel & Conference Center (Madiun)
 ASTON Malang City Hotel (Malang) Opening SOON
 ASTON Sidoarjo City Hotel & Conference Center (Sidoarjo)
 ASTON Sumenep City Hotel (Sumenep) Opening SOON

The Alana

 The Alana Hotel Surabaya by ASTON (Surabaya)

Quest Hotel

 Quest Hotel Darmo Surabaya by ASTON (Surabaya)

NEO+ & NEO

 Hotel NEO+ Waru Sidoarjo by ASTON (Sidoarjo)
 Hotel NEO Gubeng Surabaya by ASTON (Surabaya)

favehotel

 favehotel Graha Agung (Surabaya)
 favehotel Kediri (Kediri) Opening SOON
 favehotel Royal Sudirman Lumajang (Lumajang) Opening SOON
 favehotel Madiun (Madiun)
 favehotel Malang (Malang)
 favehotel MEX Surabaya (Surabaya)
 favehotel Rungkut (Surabaya)
 favehotel Sidoarjo (Sidoarjo)
 favehotel Sudirman Bojonegoro (Bojonegoro)
 favehotel Tuban (Tuban)

Bali 
ASTON
 Aston Canggu Beach Resort
 Aston Denpasar Hotel and Convention Center
 Aston Kuta Hotel and Residence
HOTEL NEO
 Hotel NEO Denpasar
 Hotel NEO Kuta Jelantik 
 Hotel NEO+ Kuta Legian 
HARPER
 HARPER Kuta
KAMUELA VILLAS
 Kamuela Villas and Suites Sanur 
 Royal Kamuela Villas & Suites at Monkey Forest Ubud
QUEST HOTEL
 Quest Hotel Kuta
 Quest San Hotel Denpasar
favehotels
 favehotel Kuta Kartika Plaza
 favehotel Kuta Square
 favehotel Sunset Seminyak

West Nusa Tenggara 
ASTON
 Aston Inn Mataram
 Aston Sunset Beach Resort Gili Trawangan
favehotels
 favehotel Langko Mataram

East Nusa Tenggara 
ASTON
 Aston Kupang Hotel & Convention Center
HOTEL NEO
 Hotel Neo Eltari (Kupang)

Sumatera 
ASTON
 Aston Batam Hotel & Residence - (Batam) 
 Aston Inn Gideon - (Batam) 
 Aston Jambi Hotel & Conference Center - (Jambi)
 Aston Karimun City Hotel - (Riau)
 Aston Lampung City Hotel - (Lampung)
 Aston Palembang Hotel & Conference Center - (Palembang)
 Aston Tanjung Pinang Hotel & Conference Center - (Riau)
favehotels
 favehotel Olo - (Padang)
 favehotel Palembang - (Palembang)
 favehotel Prabumulih - (Palembang)
 favehotel S. Parman - (Medan)
 favehotel Sudirman - (Pekanbaru)
HARPER
 Harper Palembang - (Palembang)
 Harper Wahid Hasyim - (Medan)

Kalimantan 
ASTON
 Aston Banua Hotel & Convention Center - (Banjarmasin)
 Aston Pontianak Hotel & Convention Center - (Pontianak) 
 Aston Samarinda Hotel & Convention Center - (Samarinda) 
 Aston Ketapang City Hotel - (West Kalimantan)
 Aston Tanjung City Hotel - (South Kalimantan)
favehotels
 favehotel Ahmad Yani - (Banjarmasin)
 favehotel Banjarbaru - (Banjarmasin)
 favehotel Ketapang - (West Kalimantan)
 favehotel M.T. Haryono - (Balikpapan)
HOTEL NEO
 Hotel NEO Gajah Mada - (Pontianak)
 Hotel NEO Palma - (Palangkaraya)
 Hotel NEO+ Balikpapan - (Balikpapan)
QUEST HOTEL
 Quest Hotel Balikpapan - (Balikpapan)

Sulawesi 
ASTON
 ASTON Makassar Hotel & Convention Center - (South Sulawesi)
 ASTON Manado Hotel - (North Sulawesi)
 ASTON Gorontalo 
favehotels
 favehotel Bitung - (North Sulawesi)
 favehotel Losari - (South Sulawesi)
HARPER
 Harper Perintis Makassar - (South Sulawesi)

Papua 
ASTON
 Aston Jayapura Hotel & Convention Center - (Jayapura)
 Aston Niu Manokwari - (Manokwari)
favehotels
 favehotel Sorong - (Sorong)

Malaysia  
 favehotel Cenang Beach - (Langkawi)
 Hotel NEO+ Penang - (Penang)

Philippines 
(Hotels in the Philippines are under management of Chroma Hospitality, a subsidiary of Filinvest)
 Quest Hotel & Conference Center, Cebu 
 Quest Hotel & Conference Center, Clark (Clark Freeport and Special Economic Zone, Angeles City) 
 Crimson Hotel Filinvest City (Alabang, Metro Manila)
 Crimson Resort & Spa Mactan (Cebu)
 Crimson Resort & Spa Boracay

References

External links
Archipelago International corporate website

Companies based in Jakarta
Hospitality companies established in 1997
Hospitality companies of Indonesia
Hotel chains in Indonesia
Indonesian brands
Indonesian companies established in 1997
Privately held companies of Indonesia